Prabhu Dayal Himatsingka (16 August 1889 – 2 June 1991) was an Indian politician. He was elected to the Lok Sabha, the lower house of the Parliament of India, from Godda, Bihar as a member of the Indian National Congress.

References

External links
 Official biographical sketch in Parliament of India website

Indian National Congress politicians
India MPs 1962–1967
India MPs 1967–1970
Lok Sabha members from Bihar
1889 births
1991 deaths
Indian centenarians
Men centenarians